Konstantin was a 74-gun  built for the Imperial Russian Navy in the mid-1830s. The ship was assigned to the Baltic Fleet for her entire career. She was one of the ships deployed to Denmark during the First Schleswig War of 1848–50 to help preserve Denmark's territorial integrity against Prussia. The ship was converted to steam power in 1852–54 and cruised the Baltic Sea in 1857–60 before she was placed in ordinary. Konstantin was stricken from the navy list in 1864 and sold for scrap.

Description
As built she was armed with a variety of smoothbore guns: On the forecastle and quarterdeck, the ship was fitted with either 16 eight-pounder guns and six 24-pounder carronades or twenty 24-pounder carronades. On her upper deck, she carried 30 short 24-pounder guns and, on her lower deck, Konstantin was fitted with 24 short 36-pounder guns and four 60-pounder licornes. Her crew numbered 669 officers and enlisted men.

In 1852–54, Konstantin was rebuilt and converted to steam with a British-built Humphrys & Tennant steam engine of 450 nominal horsepower that drove a single propeller shaft. Enlarged to accommodate the steam engine and its boilers, she displaced  and the ship measured 2,631 tons burthen. Forward her draft measured  and  aft. Konstantin was also rearmed when her reconstruction was complete. The ship now carried one  shell gun, one 36-pounder gunnade, fourteen 30-pounder carronades, and two short 30-pounder guns on her quarterdeck and forecastle. On her upper deck, the ship carried four long 30-pounders, 20 short 24-pounder guns, and four 60-pounder licornes. The armament of her lower deck consisted of twenty-six 68-pounder shell guns and two long 30-pounder guns.
410</ref>

Career
Konstantin was laid down on 16 December 1835 at the Okhta Shipyard in St. Petersburg. The ship was launched on 24 August 1837 and cruised the Baltic in 1839–47. She sailed to Denmark, along with most of the Baltic Fleet, to show the flag during the First Schleswig War between Denmark, Sweden and Prussia. Tsar Nicholas I was determined to support the integrity of Denmark so he deployed a large force in Danish waters for the duration of the war, although it did not actively participate in the war.

Konstantin was rebuilt as a screw ship of the line between 1852 and 1854. She transported troops from Sveaborg to Kronstadt in 1856. The ship cruised the Baltic for the next three years before she was laid up. The ship was stricken from the naval list on 8 February 1864 and subsequently scrapped.

Notes

Citations

References

Naval ships of Russia
1837 ships
Ships of the line of the Imperial Russian Navy